"Taylor" is a song by American singer-songwriter Jack Johnson. It was the third single released from his second studio album, On and On (2003), on November 3, 2003. Ben Stiller is featured in the extended version of the music video for the song. It peaked at No. 33 in New Zealand and No. 27 in Australia. In the United States, it reached No. 5 on the Billboard Adult Alternative Songs chart.

Track listing
Australian CD single
 "Taylor" (album version)
 "Gone" (live)
 "Girl I Want to Lay You Down" (live)
 "Mudfootball" (live)

Charts

Release history

References

External links
 "Taylor" lyrics

2003 singles
2003 songs
Jack Johnson (musician) songs
Modular Recordings singles
Song recordings produced by Mario Caldato Jr.
Songs written by Jack Johnson (musician)